More Hall Reservoir is a reservoir located in the Ewden valley near Sheffield, South Yorkshire, England. The reservoir is situated to the south of Bolsterstone and is linked to the Broomhead Reservoir to the west.

Carr House Meadows, a local nature reserve borders the reservoir to the south.

References 

Reservoirs of the Peak District
Reservoirs in South Yorkshire